The women's 1500 metres race of the 2012 World Single Distance Speed Skating Championships was held on 23 March at 16:30 local time.

Results

References

2012 World Single Distance Speed Skating Championships
World